Andrej Šali (born 1963, Kranj, Slovenia) is a computational structural biologist. Since 2003, he has been Professor in the Department of Bioengineering and Therapeutic Sciences at University of California, San Francisco. He also serves as an editor of the journal Structure.

Education
Šali received his Bachelor of Science degree in Chemistry from University of Ljubljana, 1987; his Ph.D. in Molecular Biophysics from Birkbeck College, University of London, 1991 (working with Tom Blundell); and did postdoctoral work at Harvard University (working with Martin Karplus).

Research
Sali joined the faculty of the Rockefeller University in 1995, following his postdoctoral research at Harvard University. He is using computation grounded in the laws of physics and evolution to study the structure and function of proteins. For example, he developed comparative protein structure modeling by satisfaction of spatial restraints, implemented in program MODELLER and integrative structure determination of macromolecular assemblies, implemented in program IMP.

Research impact
Sali contributes greatly  to structural biology by developing and applying computational methods for structural modeling and analysis of proteins. The two most often used programs developed by his research group include "MODELLER" for comparative protein structure modeling and "IMP" for integrative structure determination.

As of January 2022, Šali published approximately 400 papers, which were cited approximately 89,000 times per Google Scholar. His Hirsch-index is 132 (i.e., 132 publication have been cited at least 132 times).

In 2018, Šali was elected member of the National Academy of Sciences in recognition of his contributions to biophysics and computational biology.

Notable alumni from Šali Lab

References

External links
 Homepage of Šali's laboratory

1963 births
Living people
Slovenian biologists
Alumni of Birkbeck, University of London
Harvard University alumni
University of California, San Francisco faculty
University of Ljubljana alumni
People from Kranj
Fellows of the International Society for Computational Biology
21st-century American biologists
Members of the United States National Academy of Sciences
Bijvoet Medal recipients